The Professional Fighters League, formerly known as the World Series of Fighting prior to April 2017, is an American mixed martial arts (MMA) promotion that was started in 2012 and based in Washington, District of Columbia.

This list is an up-to-date roster of those fighters currently under contract with the PFL. Unless otherwise cited, all records are retrieved from tapology.com.

PFL Regular Season

Heavyweights (265 lb, 120 kg)

Light Heavyweights (205 lb, 93 kg)

Welterweights (170 lb, 77 kg)

Lightweights (155 lb, 70 kg)

Women's lightweights (155 lb, 70 kg)

Featherweights (145 lb, 65 kg)

Women's featherweights (145 lb, 65 kg)

Women's flyweights (125 lb, 56 kg)

PFL Europe

Light Heavyweights (205 lb, 93 kg)

Lightweights (155 lb, 70 kg)

Bantamweights (135 lb, 61 kg)

Women's flyweights (125 lb, 56 kg)

See also
List of PFL champions
List of PFL events
List of current UFC fighters
List of current ACA fighters
List of current Bellator fighters
List of current Brave CF fighters
List of current Combate Global fighters
List of current Invicta FC fighters
List of current KSW fighters
List of current ONE fighters
List of current Rizin FF fighters
List of current Road FC fighters

References

External links 
PFL Fighters

Lists of mixed martial artists
Professional Fighters League
Professional Fighters League fighters